Alfred Pavlovich Fyodorov (June 7, 1935 – October 8, 2001) was a Soviet football player and coach.

Honours
 Soviet Cup finalist: 1964.

International career
Fyodorov played his only game for USSR on September 4, 1965, in a friendly against Yugoslavia.

External links
  Profile

1935 births
2001 deaths
Soviet footballers
Soviet Union international footballers
PFC Krylia Sovetov Samara players
Russian footballers
FC Lada-Tolyatti managers
PFC Krylia Sovetov Samara managers
FC Neftyanik Ufa managers
FC Mordovia Saransk managers
Association football midfielders
Russian football managers